Galloisiana kiyosawai is a species of insect in the family Grylloblattidae that is endemic to Japan. Its type locality is Hirayu Warm Springs, Japan.

Range and habitat
It is found in montane habitats in central Honshu.

References

Grylloblattidae
Insects of Japan
Endemic fauna of Japan